The Hidden Words (Persian: کلمات مکنونه) is a book written in Baghdad around 1858 by Baháʼu'lláh, the founder of the Baháʼí Faith, while he walked along the banks of the Tigris river during his exile there. The work is written partly in Arabic and partly in Persian.

The Hidden Words is written in the form of a collection of short aphorisms, 71 in Arabic and 82 in Persian, in which Baháʼu'lláh claims to have taken the basic essence of certain spiritual truths and written them in brief form. Baháʼís are advised by ʻAbdu'l-Bahá, Baháʼu'lláh's son and the authorized interpreter of his teachings, to read them every day and every night and to implement their latent wisdom into their daily lives. He also said that The Hidden Words is "a treasury of divine mysteries" and that when one ponders its contents, "the doors of the mysteries will open."

History 
There is a Shiʻa Muslim tradition called "Mushaf of Fatimah", which speaks of Fatimah upon the passing of her father, Muhammad. There are several versions of this tradition, but common to all are that the angel Gabriel appeared to her and consoled her by telling her things that she wrote in a book. According to one tradition they were prophesies. The book, if ever physical, did not survive, and was seen to be something that the Mahdi would reveal in the last days.

Baháʼís believe that The Hidden Words was revealed by Baháʼu'lláh in fulfillment of this tradition. Baháʼu'lláh originally named the book The Book of Fatimah, though he later referred to it in its modern appellation. This aspect of fulfillment corresponds with the Baháʼí beliefs that end times prophesies of all the world's religions are to be interpreted mystically and metaphorically. This puts the Baháʼí understanding of what Gabriel revealed to Fatimah somewhat at odds with the Shiʻa traditions.

According to Jonah Winters, there have been more translations of The Hidden Words than of any other Bahá'í text. It was first translated in 1894, meaning it was one of the first books of Baha'i scripture to be translated into English. The current official translation by Shoghi Effendi was the result of a process of drafts beginning in 1923 and ending with a final revision in 1954.

Text 
The text of The Hidden Words is divided into two sections: one in Arabic and the other in Persian. Each consists of a series of short, numbered passages. The Arabic has 71 passages and the Persian has 82.

Each passage begins with an invocation, many of which repeat. Some common invocations include "O Son of Spirit", "O Son of Man", and "O Son of Being". Baháʼí prayers are written in the first person of humanity, so that the reader can feel like they are having a conversation with God. The Hidden Words are written in the first person of God, so that the reader feels like God is speaking to them.

Introduction 
From the Arabic, the following is the introduction written by Baháʼu'lláh:

"HE IS THE GLORY OF GLORIES 
This is that which hath descended from the realm of glory, uttered by the tongue of power and might, and revealed unto the Prophets of old. We have taken the inner essence thereof and clothed it in the garment of brevity, as a token of grace unto the righteous, that they may stand faithful unto the Covenant of God, may fulfill in their lives His trust, and in the realm of spirit obtain the gem of Divine virtue."

Samples 
From the Arabic

1. "O SON OF SPIRIT!
My first counsel is this: Possess a pure, kindly and radiant heart, that thine may be a sovereignty ancient, imperishable and everlasting.

7. "O SON OF MAN!
If thou lovest Me, turn away from thyself; and if thou seekest My pleasure, regard not thine own; that thou mayest die in Me and I may eternally live in thee."

49. "O SON OF MAN!
The true lover yearneth for tribulation even as doth the rebel for forgiveness and the sinful for mercy."

From the Persian
3. "O FRIEND!
In the garden of thy heart plant naught but the rose of love, and from the nightingale of affection and desire loosen not thy hold. Treasure the companionship of the righteous and eschew all fellowship with the ungodly."

12. "O MAN OF TWO VISIONS!
Close one eye and open the other. Close one to the world and all that is therein, and open the other to the hallowed beauty of the Beloved."

27. "O SON OF DUST!
All that is in heaven and earth I have ordained for thee, except the human heart, which I have made the habitation of My beauty and glory; yet thou didst give My home and dwelling to another than Me; and whenever the manifestation of My holiness sought His own abode, a stranger found He there, and, homeless, hastened unto the sanctuary of the Beloved. Notwithstanding I have concealed thy secret and desired not thy shame."

Ending 
After the last passage, Baháʼu'lláh wrote:
"The mystic and wondrous Bride, hidden ere this beneath the veiling of utterance, hath now, by the grace of God and His divine favor, been made manifest even as the resplendent light shed by the beauty of the Beloved. I bear witness, O friends! that the favor is complete, the argument fulfilled, the proof manifest and the evidence established. Let it now be seen what your endeavors in the path of detachment will reveal. In this wise hath the divine favor been fully vouchsafed unto you and unto them that are in heaven and on earth. All praise to God, the Lord of all Worlds."

See also 

 Kitáb-i-Aqdas ("The Most Holy Book")
 Kitáb-i-Íqán ("The Book of Certitude")
 Gleanings from the Writings of Baháʼu'lláh
 Baháʼí literature

References

Further reading 
 
Banani, Amin (2007). The Hidden Words of Bahāullāh in Faridun Vahman and Claus V. Pedersen, eds., Religious Texts in Iranian Languages: In Honour of Professor Ahmad Tafazzoli and Professor Jes P. Asmussen. Copenhagen, Denmark. pp. 351–60.
 
 
 Lewis, Franklin (1997). Scripture As Literature: Sifting through the Layers of the Text Bahaʾi Studies Review 7. pp. 125–46.
 Ma'ani, Dariush. A Treasure House of Mysteries: Studies by the author on the Hidden Words of Baháʼu'lláh.
 Malouf, Diana (1997). Unveiling the Hidden Words: The Norms Used by Shoghi Effendi in His Translation of the Hidden Words. Oxford, UK: George Ronald.

 Savi, Julio (1997). The Love Relationship between God and Humanity: Reflections on Bahāullāh's Hidden Words in Moojan Momen, ed., Scripture and Revelation, Oxford, UK: George Ronald. pp. 283–307.

External links 

 The Hidden Words at the official Baháʼí Reference Library
 Compendium on The Hidden Words
 The Hidden Words in many languages (bilingual display)
 (in Persian and Arabic)

Works by Baháʼu'lláh
1857 books